Rafael Benjumea y Cabeza de Vaca  (29 January 1939 – 7 April 2021; marqués de Valdecañas, conde de Peñón de la Vega & conde de Guadalhorce) was a Spanish aristocrat and engineer.

References

1939 births
2021 deaths
Spanish nobility
Spanish engineers
Technical University of Madrid alumni
Michigan State University alumni
People from Málaga
Fulbright alumni